People's Park station may refer to:

 People's Park station (Chengdu Metro), a station on the Chengdu Metro in Chengdu, China
 People's Park station (Nanchang Metro), a station on Line 4 of the Nanchang Metro in Nanchang, China
 People's Park station (Zhengzhou Metro), a station on Line 3 of the Zhengzhou Metro in Zhengzhou, China